Václav Švejcar (1962–2008) was a Czech artist and author of meditative images.

Exhibits 
From 1991, Václav Švejcar has done many exhibitions throughout the Czech Republic, as well as in New York City, and participated in several joint exhibitions in Germany (1990), Austria (1996, 1997and 2004) and Florida in the United States (2006).

Gallery

See also 
 List of Czech photographers

External links 
 

1962 births
2008 deaths
Czech artists